First United Methodist Church is a historic United Methodist church building located at 201 E. Main Street in Lincolnton, Lincoln County, North Carolina.  It was built in three stages in 1919–1920, 1936, and 1956–1957.  The oldest section is a two-story Classical Revival style brick church with a two-story portico and dome-covered sanctuary.

It was listed on the National Register of Historic Places in 1994. It is located in the Lincolnton Commercial Historic District.

References

United Methodist churches in North Carolina
Churches on the National Register of Historic Places in North Carolina
Neoclassical architecture in North Carolina
Churches completed in 1920
Churches in Lincoln County, North Carolina
National Register of Historic Places in Lincoln County, North Carolina
Historic district contributing properties in North Carolina
Neoclassical church buildings in the United States